Uthinia is a genus of moths of the family Crambidae. It contains only one species, Uthinia albisignalis, which is found in Asia, including India, Indonesia and Taiwan.

References

Natural History Museum Lepidoptera genus database

Musotiminae
Monotypic moth genera
Crambidae genera